Ribera Baixa is a comarca in the province of Valencia, Valencian Community, Spain.

Municipalities

Albalat de la Ribera
Almussafes
Benicull de Xúquer
Corbera
Cullera
Favara
Fortaleny
Llaurí
Polinyà de Xúquer
Riola
Sollana
Sueca

 
Comarques of the Valencian Community
Geography of the Province of Valencia